Urma is an alternative band from Cluj-Napoca, Transylvania, Romania. The band was formed in spring of 2003.

Their music would be described mostly as acoustic rock, with using many types of instruments (such as flute, saxophone and strings). All the lyrics are written in English.

The band has gained popularity in many countries of Central and Western Europe; they have toured in Germany, France, Switzerland and England.

History
Initially, Urma was formed by two musicians, Mani Gutău and Dan "Byron" Radu. They had met in Cluj and decided to create a new project. Soon afterwards two other musicians, Dominic Csergö and Sorin Erhan, joined the band, and they started work in the studio.

The first album, Nomad Rhymes, was released on December 10, 2004. Two years later, in 2005, followed the second album, Anger As a Gift. The title, in Mani's words, reflects the content of Urma's music: "In the world, seems defective, wonderful things are still going on. And anger, caused by lack of normal existence can be the major ingredient of a good thing. It doesn't criticize, but changes. For example. As an alternative."

In 2006, Dan Byron left the band to start his own project, called byron. In spite of it Urma has released the third album, Trend Off, that's available on  iTunes now. After release, the band took a break in its activity and appeared on scene again in 2009, with the new composition.

Band members

Current members

 Mani Gutău - vocals, guitar (2003–present)
 Vlad Cotruş - electric guitar (2016–present)
 Mihai Moldoveanu - bass (2015-2016, 2018–present)
 Luis Angel Palomino - saxophone, flute (2009–present) 
 Dominic Csergö - drums (2003-2016, 2018–present)

Former members
 Dan Byron - vocals, guitar, flute (2003-2006)
 Catrinel Bejenariu - vocals (2009-2011)
 Sorin Erhan - bass (2003-2008, 2009-2014)
 Jimmy Cserkesz - guitar (2009-2015)
 Ati Panaitescu - percussion (2009-2012)
 Eduard Târâș - bass (2017 - 2018)
 Marius "Ciupi" Ciupitu - drums (2017-2018)
 Sebastian Burneci - trumpet (2013-2019)

Discography

Studio albums

 Nomad Rhymes (2004)
 Anger As a Gift (2005)
 Trend Off (2007)
 Lost End Found (2013)

References

External links
  Urma website
 Urma on Facebook
 Urma on Myspace

Romanian alternative rock groups
Musical groups established in 2003